Vikram Chandra may refer to:

 Vikram Chandra (novelist) (born 1961), Indian-American writer
 Vikram Chandra (journalist) (born 1967), Indian television journalist